Metacyrba taeniola is a species of spider in the family Salticidae, the jumping spiders. M. taeniola differs from related species such as Metacyrba floridana and M. punctata by its greater overall size, and by the relative broadness of its carapace, which is around 70% of the length of the carapace.

Subspecies
 Metacyrba taeniola taeniola (Hentz, 1846) – eastern USA to midwestern USA, northwestern Mexico
 Metacyrba taeniola similis Banks, 1904 – eastern USA, northeastern Mexico

References

External links
 BugGuide page for Metacyrba taeniola taeniola

Salticidae
Spiders of the United States
Spiders of Mexico
Spiders described in 1846